Chionodes fumatella, the downland groundling, is a moth of the family Gelechiidae. It is found in almost all of Europe (except Portugal and Croatia). Outside of Europe, it is found in Turkey, the Caucasus, Mongolia and from Siberia to the Russian Far East.

The wingspan is 12–19 mm. The forewings are smoky-grey brown with three black spots. The hindwings are griseous (mottled grey). Adults have been recorded on wing from June to August. 
The larvae have been reared on Lotus corniculatus.

References

Moths described in 1850
Chionodes
Moths of Europe
Moths of Asia